The Atlantic lobefin dogfish (Squalus lobularis) is a dogfish described in 2016. It is a member of the family Squalidae, found off the coast of Brazil to Argentina.

References

Squalus
Fish of Brazil
Fish of Uruguay
Fish of Argentina
Fish described in 2016